Aliabad-e Seyyed Rahim (also Romanized as ‘Alīābād-e Seyyed Raḩīm) is a village in Beyhaq Rural District, Sheshtomad District, Sabzevar County, Razavi Khorasan Province, Iran. At the 2006 census, its population was 270, in 94 families.

See also 

 List of cities, towns and villages in Razavi Khorasan Province

References 

Populated places in Sabzevar County